At least three ships of the Argentine Navy have been named Py or Comodoro Py:

 , a minesweeper previously the German Margot and renamed on transfer in 1922. She was decommissioned in 1937.
 , a  commissioned in 1939 and transferred to Paraguay as Teniente Fariña in 1968.
 , a  launched in 1944 as USS Perkins and renamed on transfer in 1973. She was expended as a target in 1987.

Argentine Navy ship names